Oussama Idrissi (born 26 February 1996) is a professional footballer who plays as a winger for Eredivisie club Feyenoord, on loan from La Liga club Sevilla, and the Morocco national team. Born in the Netherlands to Moroccan parents, he has represented the Netherlands at various youth levels, before declaring his allegiance to Morocco.

Club career

Groningen
Idrissi made his professional debut for FC Groningen on 19 December 2015 in the Eredivisie match against Heracles Almelo. He came on in the 70th minute for Jarchinio Antonia. He scored his first league goal for the club on 7 February 2016 in a 2–0 home win over Cambuur. His goal, assisted by Simon Tibbling, came in the 75th minute. In October 2017, after playing regularly for two years in Groningen, the club suspended him and Mimoun Mahi citing disciplinary problems.

AZ
On 17 January 2018, Idrissi signed a contract with AZ, in a deal keeping him in Alkmaar through the 2021–22 season. He made his league debut for his new club on 19 January 2018 in a 1–1 away draw with Utrecht. He was subbed on for Jeremy Helmer in the 77th minute. He scored his first league goal for AZ on 24 February 2018 in a 2–1 home victory over Sparta Rotterdam. Idrissi also provided an assist to Wout Weghorst for AZ's first goal of the day. Idrissi's goal, assisted by Stijn Wuytens, came in the 86th minute and won the match for AZ.

On 25 October 2019, he scored his first goal in the Europa League during a 6–0 rout against Astana. He continued his strong form throughout the 2019–20 season, and won the Eredivisie player of the month award in both December and January, becoming the first player to win the award twice in a row.

Sevilla
On 5 October 2020, Idrissi signed for Sevilla until 2025.

Ajax (loan)
On 31 January 2021, the final day of the winter transfer window, it was reported that Idrissi joined Ajax on a 6-month loan spell.

Cádiz (loan)
On 20 January 2022, Idrissi joined Cádiz on loan until the end of the season.

Feyenoord (loan) 
On 27 July 2022, Idrissi joined Feyenoord on loan until the end of the 2022–23 season.

International career
Idrissi has represented the Netherlands at various youth levels. He was called up by the Moroccan senior team in November 2018, and he declared his international allegiance to Morocco in February 2019. In March 2019 he was cleared by FIFA to represent Morocco. He made his debut for Morocco national football team on 22 March 2019 in an Africa Cup of Nations qualifier against Malawi, as a starter.

Career statistics

Club

International

Honours
Ajax
 Eredivisie: 2020–21
 KNVB Cup: 2020–21
Individual
 KNVB Cup Top Scorer: 2018–19
 AZ Alkmaar Goal of the Season: 2019–20
 Eredivisie Player of the Month: December 2019; January 2020

References

External links
 
 Voetbal International profile 
 
 

1996 births
Living people
Sportspeople from Bergen op Zoom
Citizens of Morocco through descent
Association football wingers
Dutch footballers
Netherlands under-21 international footballers
Netherlands youth international footballers
Dutch sportspeople of Moroccan descent
FC Groningen players
AZ Alkmaar players
AFC Ajax players
Eredivisie players
La Liga players
Sevilla FC players
Moroccan footballers
Morocco international footballers
2019 Africa Cup of Nations players
Moroccan expatriate footballers
Moroccan expatriate sportspeople in Spain
Expatriate footballers in Spain
RKSV Halsteren players
DOSKO players
Cádiz CF players
Footballers from North Brabant
Dutch expatriate sportspeople in Spain
Dutch expatriate footballers